Rear Admiral James Horsford Cockburn (1817 – 10 February 1872) was a Royal Navy officer who became Commander-in-Chief, East Indies Station.

Naval career
Cockburn joined the Royal Navy in 1829. Promoted to Captain in 1850, he commanded HMS Cossack in the Black Sea during the Crimean War, following by HMS Diadem and then HMS Seringapatam. He was appointed Commander-in-Chief, East Indies Station in 1870. He died in that office while travelling from Trincomalee to Calcutta in 1872.

Family
In 1852 he married Harriet Emily Gedge; they had one son and seven daughters.

References

1817 births
1872 deaths
Royal Navy rear admirals